The Smith & Wesson Sigma, was Smith & Wesson's first venture into using synthetic materials in pistol construction, using high-strength polymer material for the frame. The pistol is similar to a Glock safe-action pistol in both its design and operation, leading to controversy and speculation regarding the pistol's patents' legality.

Description
Created in 1994, the Sigma incorporates a pre-set striker firing mechanism. It is available in both .40 S&W cartridge and 9×19mm Parabellum, being one of the first pistols purpose-designed to handle the .40 S&W. Similarly styled sub-compact designs in .380 ACP and 9×19mm were also produced. A limited number of these pistols were also chambered in .357 SIG. Material used for the slide is zinc-aluminium alloy known as ZAMAK.

Patent issue
The Sigma series pistols were so similar to the competing Glock pistols that Glock sued Smith & Wesson for patent infringement. The case was settled out of court in 1997, with S&W agreeing to make alterations to the Sigma design and pay an undisclosed amount to Glock.

Former users
 : Afghan National Army, Border patrol and police (22,000+ handguns)
 : Western Australia Police

See also
 Smith & Wesson
 Smith & Wesson M&P

References

External links
 Official page

.357 SIG semi-automatic pistols
.40 S&W semi-automatic pistols
9mm Parabellum semi-automatic pistols
Police weapons
Smith & Wesson semi-automatic pistols
Semi-automatic pistols of the United States